Sekolah Menengah Kebangsaan Tuanku Abdul Rahman or known as SMKTAR is a secondary school located in a small town, Gemas in Negeri Sembilan, Malaysia.

This school takes the name of the first Yang di-Pertuan Agong of Malaysia, As of 2009, it is constituted of 980 students: 452 male and 528 female students.

Secondary schools in Malaysia
Schools in Negeri Sembilan